The Yakutat Glacier is a glacier in the Brabazon Range of southeastern  Alaska. It is one of the fastest moving glaciers in the world, and has been retreating since Little Ice Age.  Approximate elevation .

See also 
List of glaciers

References

Glaciers of Alaska
Glaciers of Yakutat City and Borough, Alaska